Patrick Kostner (born 28 February 1988) is an Austrian footballer who plays for First Vienna FC.

References

Austrian footballers
Austrian Football Bundesliga players
Kapfenberger SV players
SKN St. Pölten players
First Vienna FC players
1988 births
Living people
Association football goalkeepers